Stade Montois Football is a French association football club founded in 1921. They are based in the town of Mont-de-Marsan and their home stadium is the Stade de l'Argenté, which has a capacity of 6,000 spectators. As of the 2022–23 season, they play in the Championnat National 3.

History

Stade Montois Football was formed in 1921 as the association football section of Stade Montois Club Omnisports, a 28 section multi-sport club which is best known for its rugby team.

The club was four-times consecutive champion of the Division d'Honneur South-West between 1945 and 1948, and as a result were qualified to play the first season of the national Championnat de France Amateur, the top level of amateur football in France, in the 1948–49 season. They finished top of the west group, and participated in the four-team final playoff, eventually finishing third. The club were regular participants at this level until the division was integrated into the French football pyramid at level 3 in 1971. They were relegated from the then Division 3 in 1973. In 1978 they were granted access to the newly created fourth level of French football, where they stayed until gaining promotion in 1982. They remained at the third level until the FFF reorganised the league again in 1993, when they were placed in the fourth level Championnat de France Amateur. 

In 1996 the club finished top of group B of the National 2 and won promotion to the third tier once again. However another league reorganisation caused them to be returned to the fourth level, as the Championnat National restructured from two groups to one. A season later they were relegated to the fifth tier, Championnat de France Amateur 2. They won promotion as champions of their group in 2011 and played at the fourth level until 2019. They were relegated, promoted and relegated again in each of the next three completed season.

The club reached the last 16 of the Coupe de France in 1927, and has reached the last 32 six times, the latest in 1995.

Current squad

Honours
 Division d'Honneur South West: 1945, 1946, 1947, 1948, 1954, 1961, 1966
 Championnat de France Amateur (Premier Amateur Division): 1949 (Group winner)
 National 2/Division 4 (fourth tier): 1996 (Group winner), 1982 (Group winner)
 Championnat de France Amateur 2 (fifth tier): 2011 (Group winner)

Notable former players

 Jacques Foix
 Joel Bats
 Gaëtan Laborde

References

External links
 
Official SkyRock

Montois
1921 establishments in France
Sport in Landes (department)
Football clubs in Nouvelle-Aquitaine
Mont-de-Marsan